Cornelis Martinus Anthinius Maria Doorakkers (born 2 March 1963 in Gilze, Netherlands) is a former Grand Prix motorcycle road racer.

Cees Doorakker was the 250cc Dutch champion in 1984 and 1986. In 1986 he also reached the championship in the 500cc class.
Doorakkers raced in the Grand Prix road race world championship between 1984 and 1995. Being a privateer without factory supported machines, he scored only a few points, his best result being a seventh place at the Yugoslavian Grand Prix in Rijeka in 1990. That season he reached a total of 39 points, 16th in the final ranking.

In 1991 he finished the season ranked as the top privateer, ranking 14th overall (40 points). Later years were plagued by lack of money, inferior equipment and bad luck, like the jamming of his new engine in the first race of the season in Australia.

In 1995 Doorakkers decided to retire from Grand Prix motorcycle racing. In 1996 Doorakkers drove 125cc go karts (with transmission) for the Dutch championship and ended up 5th. Later on he began motorcycle racing again with titles in the BOTT-class and Supermono; at the same time he raced in the Alfa Challenge with Alfa Romeo 156 and 147.

Career statistics

Grand Prix motorcycle racing

Races by year
(key) (Races in bold indicate pole position) (Races in italics indicate fastest lap)

References

Achievements
 5th and 6th in the 24 Hours of Le Mans (motorcycle race)
 2 times beste privateer World Championship GP road race (1991: 14th; 1990: 16th)
 2 times Dutch champion 250cc
 Dutch champion 500cc
 5 times Dutch champion

1963 births
Living people
Dutch motorcycle racers
People from Gilze en Rijen
Sportspeople from North Brabant
20th-century Dutch people